Jean-François Féraud (17 April 1725, in Marseille – 8 February 1807, in Marseille) was a French Jesuit and grammarian.

Publications 
 Nouveau dictionnaire universel des arts et des sciences, français, latin et anglais : contenant la signification des mots de ces trois langues et des termes propres de chaque état et profession : avec l’explication de tout ce que renferment les arts et les sciences traduit de l’anglais de Thomas Dyche, Avignon, Vve Girard, 1756.
 Dictionnaire grammatical de la langue française, Avignon, Vve Girard ; Paris, Vincent, 1768.
 Dictionnaire critique de la langue française. Tome premier, A-D, Marseille, Mossy, 1787.
 Dictionnaire critique de la langue française. Tome second, E-N, Marseille, Mossy, 1787.
 Dictionnaire critique de la langue française. Tome troisième, O-Z, Marseille, Mossy, 1788.

Dictionary available online 
 Dictionnaire critique de la langue française Marseille, Mossy, 1787-1788 ; rééd. Niemeyer Verlag, Tübingen, 1994.

Sources 
 François-Xavier de Feller, Biographie universelle ou Dictionnaire historique des hommes qui se sont fait un nom, t.4, Lyon, Rolland-Rusand, 1822, .
 Louis-François Jauffret, Ruche provençale, t.3, Marseille Joseph-François Achard, 1820, 243 p., .
 Joseph-François Michaud, Louis-Gabriel Michaud, Biographie universelle, ancienne et moderne ou, Histoire, par ordre alphabétique de la vie publique et privée de tous les hommes qui se sont fait remarquer par leurs écrits, leurs actions, leurs talents, leurs vertus ou leurs crimes, Paris, Charles Delagrave, 1815, .

External links 
 Jalons biographiques.

1725 births
1807 deaths
19th-century French Jesuits
Grammarians from France
French lexicographers
Writers from Marseille
French male non-fiction writers
18th-century French Jesuits
Roman Catholic clergy from Marseille
18th-century lexicographers